Ashniz-e Bala (also Romanized as Ashnīz-e Bālā; also known as Ashnīz) is a village in Bafruiyeh Rural District, in the Central District of Meybod County, Yazd Province, Iran. At the 2006 census, its population was 52, in 15 families.

References 

Populated places in Meybod County